"Heat Wave" is a song by Danish pop band Alphabeat from their second studio album, The Spell (2009). The song was released in Denmark on 21 June 2010 as the album's fourth and final single. "Heat Wave" peaked at number four on the Danish Singles Chart, and was certified gold by IFPI Denmark in October 2010, denoting sales in excess of 15,000 copies.

Track listing
Digital download
"Heat Wave" – 3:24

Charts

Weekly charts

Year-end charts

References

2009 songs
2010 singles
Alphabeat songs
Eurodance songs
Copenhagen Records singles